Rukhsati was a 2014 Pakistani drama serial directed by Mohsin Mirza, produced by A&B Entertainment, and written by Amna Mufti. The drama was first aired on 12 March 2014 on Geo Entertainment, where it aired every Wednesday at 8:00 P.M. The story revolves around a young woman, Maleeha, whose life goals are destroyed after her marriage to an older man.

The series' title "Rukhsati" refers to a formal "sending off" ritual performed as part of a Pakistani Muslim wedding.

Cast
Sunita Marshall as Maleeha
Abid Ali as Maleeha's husband
Faizan Khawaja
Mehmood Akhtar
Gul-e-Rana
Seema Sehar
Sana Askari
Anum Fayyaz as Masooma
Tahira Imam
Bilal Qureshi
Asad Siddiqui
Rahma Ali as Rida
Rizwan Ali Jaffri

References

Pakistani television series